Cristo Rey Columbus High School (CRCHS or CRC) is a private, Roman Catholic, co-educational high school in Columbus, Ohio, United States. It was established in 2013 and is located in the Roman Catholic Diocese of Columbus. It follows the Cristo Rey work-study model of education for students from low-income families.

History 
The school building was built in 1899 as part of the Ohio Institution for the Deaf and Dumb (today the Ohio School for the Deaf). It was listed on the National Register of Historic Places on October 25, 1984, and the Columbus Register of Historic Properties on November 19, 1984.

Cristo Rey Columbus was established in 2013 as a part of the Cristo Rey Network of high schools. The building underwent an $18 million restoration to accommodate the new school. Renovations included motion-sensor lights in all classrooms, wi-fi, and built-in projectors that connect to students’ tablets and display their work on whiteboards, all of which become smart boards.

The school serves students from families of limited means. Students work five days a month at entry-level jobs at four dozen businesses in the metro area.

See also
 National Register of Historic Places listings in Columbus, Ohio

References

Further reading 
 Kearney, G. R. More Than a Dream: The Cristo Rey Story: How One School's Vision Is Changing the World. Chicago, Ill: Loyola Press, 2008.

External links 

 

High schools in Columbus, Ohio
High schools in Franklin County, Ohio
Catholic secondary schools in Ohio
Roman Catholic Diocese of Columbus
Cristo Rey Network
Poverty-related organizations
Educational institutions established in 2013
2013 establishments in Ohio
Columbus Register properties